Runnymede is a meadow alongside the River Thames in England, associated with the signing of Magna Carta.

Runnymede may also refer to:

Places

Australia 
 Runnymede, Queensland, a locality in the South Burnett Region, Queensland

Canada
 Runnymede, Saskatchewan, an organized hamlet
 Runnymede, Toronto, a neighbourhood in Toronto, Ontario
 Runnymede Park, a park in Toronto, Ontario
 Runnymede (TTC), a subway station in Toronto, Ontario
 Runnymede Road, a street in Toronto, Ontario
 Runnymede Theatre, a theatre in Toronto, Ontario

Sierra Leone
 Runnymede, the official residence of Her Majesty's High Commissioner to Sierra Leone in Freetown.

United Kingdom 
 Borough of Runnymede, Surrey, England
 Air Forces Memorial (British Air Forces Memorial)

United States 
 Runnymede, Kansas, US
 Runnemede, New Jersey, US

Organizations
 Runnymede Trust, a think tank
 Runnymede Collegiate Institute, Toronto, Canada
 Runnymede College, Madrid, Spain

Other uses
 Runnymede-class large landing craft, a heavy utility landing craft of the US Army
Runnymede, a fictive Maryland town that straddles the Mason-Dixon Line in some novels of Rita Mae Brown
  – one of several vessels by that name

See also
 Runnymeade, Delaware, US